Yehuda Vizan (Hebrew: יהודה ויזן, born 1985 in Yehud) is an Israeli poet, editor, translator and critic. Vizan is the editor and founder of Dehak - A Magazine For Good Literature.

Poetry

Vizan has published five books of poetry:

 Poems of Yehuda (Ah'shav, 2006)
 Introduction to Light Aesthetics (Plonit, 2008)
 Wringed (Ah'shav/Dehak, 2012)
 Counter-Regulations (Makom LeShira, 2016)
 Selected Poems 2005-2020 (Carmel, 2020)

Prose

 Pekah (Achuzat Bayit, 2016). Won the Minister of Culture Award for a first novel.

Children's book

 "At Helel and Lilith's of the Galilee city" (illustrated by Noa Ṿikhansḳi, Keren, 2019)

Editing

 Ketem - a poetry newspaper (first three issues alongside Oded Carmeli), 2006-2008.
 Charles Baudelaire - Douze petits poemes en prose, translated by: David Frischmann & Uri Nissan Gnessin (Dehak, 2010)
 Ezra Pound - Selected Writings (Dehak, 2014)
 Dehak - A Magazine For Good Literature, 2011-to present.
 Hebrew Poetry of the Haskalah: A Selection, alongside Yehosheva Samet Shinberg (Dehak, 2020)

Translation

 T. S. Eliot - Murder in the Cathedral. alongside Orit Gat, (Ah'shav, 2009)
 T. S. Eliot - Sweeney Agonistes (Ah'shav, 2009).
 Virginia Woolf - Freshwater (Dehak, 2010)
 Art Spiegelman - Maus: A Survivor's Tale, Volumes I and II (Mineged, 2010)
 Natan Zach - Imagism and Vorticism (Dehak, 2010)
 James Joyce - The Cat and the Devil (Dehak, 2012)
 James Joyce - The Cats of Copenhagen (Achuzat Bayit, 2019)
 H. G. Wells - Marxism vs. Liberalism, An Interview Of Joseph Stalin By H.G. Wells (Dehak, 2013)
 Words, Words, Words – On Hamlet. A selection of essays about the play by Voltaire, Samuel Johnson, Coleridge, Chesterton, Arnold, Eliot, Auden, Poe, Wilde & Goethe. (Resling, 2016)
 William Faulkner - The Wishing Tree, (Rimonim, 2016)
 Other People's Poems - English poetry translations (Ah'shav, 2016)
 Flannery O'Connor - The Nature and Aim of Fiction (Dehak, 2021)
 Wallace Stevens - Adagia (Dehak, 2022)
Vizan has also translated dozens of poems, essays and short plays by writers such as: Ezra Pound, T.S. Eliot, T.E. Hulme, Wyndham Lewis, Charles Olson, Louis Zukofsky, Dorothy Parker, Edgar Allan Poe, Philip Larkin, Frank O'Hara, W.H. Auden, Robert Creeley, Edward Lear, Flannery O'Connor, G. K. Chesterton, Wallace Stevens, Edith Sitwell, Hope Mirrlees, Robert Duncan, William Blake and many others. he also published a translation of several fragments from Joyce's Finnegans Wake.

External links
Meet the Iconoclast of Israel's Poetry World. An interview with Yehuda Vizan, Haaretz, 31.8. 2012
Yehuda Vizan at the Modern Hebrew Literature Bio-Bibliographical Lexicon
Yehuda Vizan at Poetry International Web 

21st-century Israeli poets
Israeli magazine editors
Israeli literary critics
1985 births
Living people
English–Hebrew translators
Israeli translators
21st-century translators
Israeli children's writers
Israeli novelists